Ciénaga Baja is a barrio in the municipality of Río Grande, Puerto Rico. Its population in 2010 was 18,385.

History
Puerto Rico was ceded by Spain in the aftermath of the Spanish–American War under the terms of the Treaty of Paris of 1898 and became an unincorporated territory of the United States. In 1899, the United States Department of War conducted a census of Puerto Rico finding that the population of Ciénaga barrio (which are Ciénaga Bajo and Ciénaga Alta) was 1,610.

As far as Río Grande is from the epicenter of the 6.3 earthquake that struck Puerto Rico on January 7, some residents in Ciénaga Baja stated they felt the earthquake and stated they lost electrical power in their homes.

Sectors
Barrios (which are roughly comparable to minor civil divisions) in turn are further subdivided into smaller local populated place areas/units called sectores (sectors in English). The types of sectores may vary, from normally sector to urbanización to reparto to barriada to residencial, among others.

The following sectors are in Ciénaga Baja barrio:

, and
.

See also

 List of communities in Puerto Rico
 List of barrios and sectors of Río Grande, Puerto Rico

References

Barrios of Río Grande, Puerto Rico